William Harris Stewart (born October 18, 1966, in Des Moines, Iowa) is an American jazz drummer. He has performed with Maceo Parker, John Scofield, Joe Lovano, Michael Brecker, Pat Metheny, Lonnie Smith, Nicholas Payton, Bill Carrothers, Steve Wilson, Seamus Blake, Larry Goldings and Peter Bernstein, and Jim Hall.

Biography
Bill Stewart's father was a trombonist, and his first and middle names are a tribute to jazz trombonist Bill Harris.

Stewart grew up in Des Moines, Iowa, listening to his parents' jazz and rhythm and blues records without much exposure to live jazz in the then relatively isolated state of Iowa. The largely self-taught drummer began playing at the age of seven.  While in high school, he played in a Top 40 cover band and the school orchestra, and went to a summer music camp at Stanford Jazz Workshop, where he met Dizzy Gillespie.  After high school graduation, Stewart attended the University of Northern Iowa in Cedar Falls, Iowa, playing in the jazz and marching bands as well as the orchestra.  He then transferred to William Paterson University (then William Paterson College), where he played in ensembles directed by Rufus Reid, studied drums with Eliot Zigmund and Horacee Arnold and took composition lessons from Dave Samuels. Stewart met future employer Joe Lovano while still in college (the two played duets in lieu of a drum lesson when Zigmund was away). Stewart also made his first recordings, with saxophonist Scott Kreitzer, and pianist Armen Donelian, while still in school, and with pianist Franck Amsallem (and Gary Peacock on bass) shortly thereafter, in 1990.

After college, Stewart moved to New York, gaining wider recognition in John Scofield's quartet with pianist Michael Eckroth and bassist Ben Street and in a trio with Larry Goldings and Peter Bernstein, which has become the longest-running group Stewart has played with, having begun in 1989 and continuing to this day, performing infrequently.  Stewart's musical horizons expanded when funk saxophonist Maceo Parker noticed Stewart upon seeing him with Larry Goldings at a regular gig at a club in Manhattan. Stewart worked with Parker from 1990 to 1991, touring and recording on three of Parker's albums. The association led to Stewart's gig with James Brown, who told Stewart that there "Ain't no funk in Iowa!" upon learning the drummer's roots. Another close associate is pianist Kevin Hays, with whom he performs, along with fellow WPC graduate, bassist Doug Weiss. The Kevin Hays trio has recorded five CDs and toured internationally.  Musical associations with Lee Konitz, Michael Brecker, Pat Metheny and many other jazz musicians have followed.

Musical style

As a drummer, Bill Stewart's playing is distinguished by its melodic focus, and its polyrhythmic, or layered character. To describe someone's drumming style as "melodic" would mean there is a sense that you could "hum along" with discernible linear phrases which tell pieces of a story, akin to a vocalist, pianist, or saxophonist. He also has a high degree of independence of his limbs, so that not only the ride cymbal and the snare/toms, but also the bass drum and hi-hat, are free to participate as melodic "first-class citizens." His drumming bears the influence of various melodic drummers who preceded him, including Max Roach, Art Blakey, Joe Morello, Roy Haynes, Jack DeJohnette, Paul Motian, and Al Foster.

As a composer, Bill Stewart prefers an avant-garde flavor. The melodies, harmonies, phrase lengths, and measure lengths are often altered so as not to conform too closely to traditional jazz language. Some of his tunes (such as "Mayberry") also feature a built-in "free blowing" section, surrounded by a composed "head" (in the case of "Mayberry", a parody of the theme song of the Andy Griffith Show.)

Technique
Stewart, for the most part, plays holding his sticks in a matched grip.

As a leader
Stewart has a considerable output as a leader, beginning with 1989's Think Before You Think, with bassist Dave Holland, pianist Marc Copland, and saxophonist Joe Lovano, on which the drummer led a session of originals and standards, including one of his own compositions.

In his next outing as a leader, Stewart assembled trumpeter Eddie Henderson, saxophonist Lovano, pianist Bill Carrothers and bassist Larry Grenadier for an entire record of Stewart compositions, Snide Remarks, which was chosen as one of the top ten jazz CDs of the year by Peter Watrous of The New York Times.

The second Blue Note album to be released under Stewart's name was 1997's Telepathy, featuring Carrothers and Grenadier along with saxophonists Steve Wilson and Seamus Blake.

In 2005, the Bill Stewart Trio, with Kevin Hays and Larry Goldings, released Keynote Speakers. The ensemble is a variation on the usual organ-guitar-drum trio, where a second keyboard (variously piano, Fender Rhodes, and other keyboard instruments) is added to the organ-drum foundation. In December 2006 he recorded Incandescence with the same trio.

Stewart has said that he thinks it very important to find an interesting combination of musicians whose abilities will complement each other and who will sound at home on the compositions slated for the given session.

Gear
Stewart plays various Zildjian K cymbals and is endorsed by the Avedis Zildjian Company. A collaboration with Paul Francis from Zildjian yielded the 22" K Custom Special Dry Complex Rides (in Thin and Medium Thin weights), which are meant to replicate the sound of an old K Zildjian cymbal Stewart has had for a long time. They were introduced in 2004. According to Stewart, "The K Custom Special Dry Complex Ride has some trashy quality, but can also be articulate. The nice crash sound gets out of the way quickly while a clean stick sound or click is evident when riding. These cymbals are very pretty, yet can be very nasty."

The cymbals were redesigned and sold as the K Custom Dry Complex II Rides since 2008 in sizes of 20, 22 and 24-inch. These custom ride cymbals feature a wider bell with a much lower profile to promote more control while offering a smooth array of rich overtones. Weight specifications are slightly heavier (medium-thin) than the first generation of Complex Rides, to make the cymbals more versatile, providing ride patterns that can be heard clearly from within an airy wash of overtones.

Zildjian has also designed the Bill Stewart Artist Series Drumsticks.

Discography

As leader
Think Before You Think (Jazz City, 1990)
Snide Remarks (Blue Note, 1995)
 Telepathy (Blue Note, 1997)
 Catability (Enja, 1998)
 Drum Crazy (Funky Kitchen, 2005)
 Keynote Speakers (2005)
 Incandescence (Pirouet, 2008)
 Live at Smalls (Smallslive, 2011)
 Ramshackle Serenade (Pirouet, 2014)
 Space Squid (Pirouet, 2015)
 Band Menu (Stewed Music, 2018)

As sideman or co-leader
With Franck Amsallem
 1990 Out a Day
 1993 Regards
 1998 Another Time

With Peter Bernstein
 1998 Earth Tones
 2003 Heart's Content
 2004 Stranger in Paradise
 2016 Let Loose

With Seamus Blake
 1993 The Call
 2007 Way Out Willy
 2009 Bellwether
 2010 Live at Smalls

With Bill Carrothers
 1993 Ye Who Enter Here (with saxophonist Anton Denner, as A Band in All Hope)
 2002 Duets with Bill Stewart
 2003 Ghost Ships
 2008 Home Row
 2010 Joy Spring

With Scott Colley
Subliminal... (Criss Cross Jazz, 1998)
 2000 The Magic Line
 2002 Initial Wisdom

With Marc Copland
 1997 Softly
 2006 New York Trio Recordings Vol. 1: Modinha
 2009 New York Trio Recordings Vol. 3: Night Whispers

With Larry Goldings
 1991 The Intimacy of the Blues
 1992 Light Blue
 1994 Caminhos Cruzados
 1995 Whatever It Takes
 1996 Big Stuff
 2002 Sweet Science
 2001 As One
 2018 Toy Tunes

With Jon Gordon
 1992 The Jon Gordon Quartet
 1998 Currents
 2000 Possibilities

With Lage Lund
 2010 Unlikely Stories
 2013 Foolhardy
 2015 Idlewild

With Pat Martino
 1996 Nightwings
 1999 Mission Accomplished

With Pat Metheny
 2000 Trio 99 → 00
 2000 Trio → Live

With Maceo Parker
 1990 Roots Revisited
 1991 Mo' Roots
 1993 Southern Exposure
1995 The Bremen Concert

With Chris Potter
 1993 Concentric Circles
 2002 Traveling Mercies (Verve)
 2004 Lift: Live at the Village Vanguard (Sunnyside)

With Jim Rotondi
 2004 New Vistas
 2006 Iron Man
 2010 1000 Rainbows

With John Scofield
 1990 Meant to Be
 1991 The John Scofield Quartet Plays Live
 1992 What We Do
 1993 Hand Jive
 1993 I Can See Your House from Here
 1994 You Speak My Language
 1994 Summertime
 1996 Quiet
 2000 Steady Groovin' 
 2004 EnRoute
 2007 This Meets That
 2015 Past Present
 2016 Country for Old Men
 2018 Combo 66
 2020 Swallow Tales

With Jesse van Ruller
 2002 Circles
 2005 Views

With others
 1988 Secrets Armen Donelian
 1990 The Wayfarer Armen Donelian
 1990 Never Forget Ron McClure
 1990 Zounds Lee Konitz
 1990 New Friends Fred Wesley
 1991 Comme Ci Comme Ca Fred Wesley
 1991 Landmarks Joe Lovano
 1992 Nighttown Don Grolnick
 1993 No Words Tim Hagans
 1993 World Away Walt Weiskopf
 1996 Forgotten Dreams Dave Pietro
 1996 Four's and Two's George Garzone
 1996 Groovin It! Hank Marr
 1996 New York Child Marty Ehrlich
 1996 Shades of Blue Bob Belden
 1997 Distant Star Bill Charlap
 1997 Here on Earth Ingrid Jensen
 1998 El Matador Kevin Hays
 1998 Now John Patitucci
 1998 Wind Dance Dave Pietro
 1999 Hard Luck Guy Eddie Hinton
 1999 Time Is of the Essence Michael Brecker
 2001 Baby Plays Around Curtis Stigers
 2002 Tour de Force Nick Brignola
 2002 United Soul Experience Wycliffe Gordon
 2003 Dig This!! Wycliffe Gordon
 2003 Love Walked In Steve Kuhn
 2003 Evolution Tommy Smith
 2003 NY1 Martial Solal
 2004 Nine Stories Wide Jonathan Kreisberg
 2004 The Jigsaw Stan Sulzmann
 2005 Past-Present-Future George Colligan
 2007 Time and the Infinite Adam Rogers
 2008 Live at Smalls Kevin Hays
 2009 Man Behind the Curtain Mark Soskin
 2013 I'll Take My Chances Dayna Stephens

References

External links
 Drummerworld – Bill Stewart's Drummerworld Page
 2002 AllAboutJazz – 2002 Interview with Bill Stewart on AllAboutJazz.com
 Bill Stewart Music - Unofficial Website with discography and interviews

1966 births
Living people
Musicians from Des Moines, Iowa
American jazz drummers
Musicians from Iowa
20th-century American drummers
American male drummers
University of Northern Iowa alumni
William Paterson University alumni
20th-century American male musicians
American male jazz musicians
Pirouet Records artists